Davis Daniel is the second studio album by American country music artist Davis Daniel. "I Miss Her Missing Me", "William and Mary", and "Tyler" were all released as singles from this album; unlike the singles from his previous album, however, none of these reached Top 40 on the Hot Country Songs charts.

Critical reception
Cub Koda of Allmusic rated the album 3 stars out of 5, saying that "while his looks outweigh the relative thinness of his voice, there's enough good stuff here to make you think that he might develop into something more than a one-shot artist." Giving it 2½ stars out of 5, Michael McCall of New Country magazine considered it an improvement over his debut album, which he called "a forgettable effort with clunky, outdated production and an aimless collection of lightweight pop-country songs", although he thought that most of the songs on Davis Daniel were "catchy" and "weightless". McCall thought that "Tyler" and "Out Here Sits the King" were the best-written on the album, and that Daniel's performance on them was "sensitive".

Track listing
"Shame on Me" (Charlotte Wilson, Lonnie Wilson) - 2:45
"I Miss Her Missing Me" (Ronnie Samoset, Craig Wiseman) - 3:32
"William and Mary" (George McCorkle, Rick Williamson) - 2:21
"Somebody's Gonna Lose" (Larry Butler, Mark Sherrill) - 3:11
"Someone Else's Star" (Skip Ewing, Jim Weatherly) - 3:34
"She Could Make a Freight Train Take a Dirt Road" (Paul Overstreet) - 4:07
"I Saw You" (Eddie Hill, Johnny Neel, John Wesley Ryles) - 3:32
"All Heaven Broke Loose Last Night" (Tim Bays, Annette Cotter, Roberta Schiller) - 2:49
"Out Here Sits the King" (Davis Daniel) - 3:12
"Tyler" (Daniel, Lance Rogge) - 4:19

Personnel
David Briggs - keyboards
Mike Brignardello - bass guitar
Buddy Cannon - background vocals
Mark Casstevens - acoustic guitar
Carol Chase - background vocals
Dan Dugmore - steel guitar
Glen Duncan - fiddle
Paul Franklin - steel guitar
Sonny Garrish - Dobro, steel guitar
Mike Lawler - synthesizer
Anthony Martin - background vocals
Danny Parks - acoustic guitar, electric guitar
Christopher Paul - background vocals
Larry Paxton - bass guitar
Dave Pomeroy - bass guitar
Ronny Scaife - background vocals
Michael Severs - electric guitar
Milton Sledge - drums
John D. Willis - acoustic guitar
Reggie Young - electric guitar

References

1994 albums
Davis Daniel albums
Polydor Records albums
Albums produced by Harold Shedd